is a hilltop Japanese castle complex situated in the city of Himeji which is located in the Hyōgo Prefecture of Japan. The castle is regarded as the finest surviving example of prototypical Japanese castle architecture, comprising a network of 83 rooms with advanced defensive systems from the feudal period. The castle is frequently known as Hakuro-jō or Shirasagi-jō ("White Egret Castle" or "White Heron Castle") because of its brilliant white exterior and supposed resemblance to a bird taking flight.

Himeji Castle dates to 1333 when Akamatsu Norimura built a fort on top of Himeyama hill. The fort was dismantled and rebuilt as Himeyama Castle in 1346 and then remodeled into Himeji Castle two centuries later. Himeji Castle was then significantly remodeled in 1581 by Toyotomi Hideyoshi, who added a three-story castle keep. In 1600, Tokugawa Ieyasu awarded the castle to Ikeda Terumasa for his help in the Battle of Sekigahara, and Ikeda completely rebuilt the castle from 1601 to 1609, expanding it into a large castle complex. Several buildings were later added to the castle complex by Honda Tadamasa from 1617 to 1618. For almost 700 years, Himeji Castle has remained intact, even throughout the bombing of Himeji in World War II, and natural disasters including the 1995 Great Hanshin earthquake.

Himeji Castle is the largest and most visited castle in Japan, and it was registered in 1993 as one of the first UNESCO World Heritage Sites in the country. The area within the middle moat of the castle complex is a designated Special Historic Site and five structures of the castle are also designated National Treasures. Along with Matsumoto Castle and Kumamoto Castle, Himeji Castle is considered one of Japan's three premier castles. In order to preserve the castle buildings, it underwent restoration work for several years and reopened to the public on March 27, 2015. The works also removed decades of dirt and grime, restoring the formerly grey roof to its original brilliant white color.

History 
Himeji Castle's construction dates to 1333, when a fort was constructed on Himeyama hill by Akamatsu Norimura, the ruler of the ancient Harima Province. In 1346, his son Sadanori demolished this fort and built Himeyama Castle in its place. In 1545, the Kuroda clan was stationed here by order of the Kodera clan, and feudal ruler Kuroda Shigetaka remodeled the castle into Himeji Castle, completing the work in 1561.

Following the Battle of Sekigahara in 1600, Tokugawa Ieyasu granted Himeji Castle to his son-in-law, Ikeda Terumasa, as a reward for his help in battle. Ikeda demolished the three-story keep that had been created by Hideyoshi, and completely rebuilt and expanded the castle from 1601 to 1609, adding three moats and transforming it into the castle complex that is seen today. The expenditure of labor involved in this expansion is believed to have totaled 2.5 million man-days. Ikeda died in 1613, passing the castle to his son, who also died three years later. In 1617, Honda Tadamasa and his family inherited the castle, and Honda added several buildings to the castle complex, including a special tower for his daughter-in-law,  called keshō yagura (Dressing Tower).

In the Meiji Period (1868–1912), many Japanese castles were destroyed. Himeji Castle was abandoned in 1871 and some of the castle corridors and gates were destroyed to make room for Japanese army barracks. The entirety of the castle complex was slated to be demolished by government policy, but it was spared by the efforts of Nakamura Shigeto, an army colonel. Although Himeji Castle was spared, Japanese castles had become obsolete and their preservation was costly.

When the han feudal system was abolished in 1871, Himeji Castle was put up for auction. The castle was purchased by a Himeji resident for 23 Japanese yen (about 200,000 yen or US$2,258 today). The buyer wanted to demolish the castle complex and develop the land, but the cost of destroying the castle was estimated to be too great, and it was again spared.

Himeji was heavily bombed in 1945, at the end of World War II, and although most of the surrounding area was burned to the ground, the castle survived intact. One firebomb was dropped on the top floor of the castle but failed to explode. In order to preserve the castle complex, substantial repair work was undertaken starting in 1956, with a labor expenditure of 250,000 man-days and a cost of 550 million yen. In January 1995, the city of Himeji was substantially damaged by the Great Hanshin earthquake, but Himeji Castle again survived virtually undamaged, demonstrating remarkable earthquake resistance. Even the bottle of sake placed on the altar at the top floor of the keep remained in place.

Historical recognition 
Himeji Castle was registered on 11 December 1993 as one of the first UNESCO World Heritage Sites in Japan. The area within the middle moat of the castle complex is a designated Special Historic Site.

Along with Matsumoto Castle and Kumamoto Castle, Himeji Castle is considered one of Japan's three premier castles. It is the most visited castle in Japan, receiving over 2,860,000 visitors in 2015. Starting in April 2010, Himeji Castle underwent restoration work to preserve the castle buildings, and reopened to the public on March 27, 2015.

Design details 
Himeji Castle is the largest castle in Japan. It serves as an excellent example of prototypical Japanese castle architecture, containing many of the defensive and architectural features associated with Japanese castles. The curved walls of Himeji Castle are sometimes said to resemble giant , but the principal materials used in the structures are stone and wood. Feudal  are installed throughout the architecture of the building, signifying the various lords that inhabited the castle throughout its history.

The specific style of the castle is a hirayama (平山城 flat hilltop). Two castles that were built during the same time and shared many of the architectural features are Matsuyama Castle (Iyo) and Tsuyama Castle.

Of these 83 buildings, 74 are designated as Important Cultural Assets: 11 corridors, 16 turrets, 15 gates, and 32 earthen walls.

It covers an area of 233 hectares (2,330,000 m2 or 576 acres), making it roughly 50 times as large as the Tokyo Dome or 60 times as large as Koshien Stadium.

Together with the main keep, three  form a cluster of towers. Externally, the keep appears to have five floors, because the second and third floors from the top appear to be a single floor; however, it actually has six floors and a basement.

The main keep has two pillars, with one standing in the east and one standing in the west.
The tree was broken in this process, so another tree was brought down from Mount Kasagata, and the two trees were joined on the third floor.

The walls of the first floor have  for holding matchlocks and spears, and at one point, the castle contained as many as 280 guns and 90 spears.

Both the third and fourth floors have platforms situated at the north and south windows called , where defenders could observe or throw objects at attackers. They also have small enclosed rooms called , where defenders could hide themselves and kill attackers by surprise as they entered the keep. The final floor, the sixth floor, has an area of only . The sixth floor windows now have iron bars in place, but in the feudal period the panoramic view from the windows was unobstructed.

Defences 

Himeji Castle contains advanced defensive systems from the feudal period.  in the shape of circles, triangles, squares, and rectangles are located throughout Himeji Castle, intended to allow defenders armed with tanegashima or archers to fire on attackers without exposing themselves. Roughly 1,000 loopholes exist in the castle buildings remaining today. Angled chutes called  were also set at numerous points in the castle walls, enabling stones or boiling oil to be poured on the heads of attackers passing by underneath, and white plaster was used in the castle's construction for its resistance to fire.

The castle complex included three moats, one of which—the outer moat—is now buried. Parts of the central moat and all of the inner moats survive. The  is a  pond which exists inside the castle; one of the purposes of this moat was to store water for use in fire prevention.

One of the castle's most important defensive elements is the confusing maze of paths leading to the castle's keep. The gates, baileys, and outer walls of the complex are organized so as to confuse an approaching force, causing it to travel in a spiral pattern around the complex on its way to the keep. The castle complex originally contained 84 gates, 15 of which were named according to the Japanese syllabary iroha (I, Ro, Ha, Ni, Ho, He, To, etc.). At present, 21 gates from the castle complex remain intact, 13 of which are named according to the Japanese syllabary.

In many cases, the castle walkways even turn back on themselves, greatly inhibiting navigation. The passages are also steep and narrow, further inhibiting entry. This system allowed the intruders to be watched and fired upon from the keep during their lengthy approach, but Himeji Castle was never attacked in this manner so the system remains untested. However, even today with the route clearly marked, many visitors have trouble navigating the castle complex.

Cultural impact 
Himeji Castle is frequently known as Hakuro-jō or Shirasagi-jō ("White Egret Castle" or "White Heron Castle") because of its brilliant white exterior and supposed resemblance to a bird taking flight. The castle has been featured extensively in foreign and Japanese films, including the James Bond movie "You Only Live Twice" (1967), and Akira Kurosawa's Kagemusha (1980) and Ran (1985). In the television miniseries Shōgun (1980) it served as a stand-in for feudal-era Osaka Castle. In the video games Civilization Revolution and Civilization V, Himeji Castle is available to build as a world wonder.  It is also to be found as a Great Building in Forge of Empires.

Lore and legend 

Himeji Castle is associated with a number of local legends. There is a disputed claim that the castle is the bona fide location of the entire legend, and the alleged Okiku's Well remains in the castle to this day. According to the legend, Okiku was falsely accused of losing dishes that were valuable family treasures, and then killed and thrown into the well. Her ghost remained to haunt the well at night, counting dishes in a despondent tone.

Himeji Castle is said to be inhabited by the yōkai Osakabehime, who lives in the castle tower and avoids humans, whom she hates. In some legends she takes the form of an old woman (or woman in her 30s) in ceremonial, twelve-layered kimono. She can read human minds and control lesser animal-like yōkai, kenzokushin.

According to the legend, Toyotomi Hideyoshi ran out of stones when building the original three-story keep, and an old woman heard about his trouble. She gave him her hand millstone even though she needed it for her trade. It was said that people who heard the story were inspired and also offered stones to Hideyoshi, speeding up the construction of the castle. To this day, the supposed stone can be seen covered with a wire net in the middle of one of the stone walls in the castle complex.

A folklore story is also associated with Sakurai Genbei, who was Ikeda Terumasa's master carpenter in the construction of the keep. According to the legend, Sakurai was dissatisfied with his construction, feeling that the keep leaned a little to the southeast. Eventually, he became distraught and climbed to the top of the keep, where he jumped to his death with a chisel in his mouth.

Visitor statistics 
 On 14 April 2009, the total number of visits since the Showa-era restoration surpassed 40 million.

Additional information

National treasures and sister castles 
Other national treasures (castles) besides Himeji Castle include Matsumoto Castle, Inuyama Castle, Matsue Castle, and Hikone Castle. The sister castles of Himeji Castle are Château de Chantilly in France and Conwy Castle in Wales. Castles that were of the same hirayama hilltop styles are Matsuyama Castle (Iyo) built in 1603 and Tsuyama Castle.

Gallery 
Panoramic overview

Views from afar

Views from below

Views at night

Views from above

Views from the interior

Views with cherry blossoms

Views of the restoration

Views of pictures

See also 
 Kōko-en, garden joining the castle complex 
 Tsuyama Castle and Matsuyama Castle (Iyo), also built in the hirayama (平山城 flat hilltop castle) style
 List of National Treasures of Japan (castles)
 List of reportedly haunted locations
 List of Special Places of Scenic Beauty, Special Historic Sites and Special Natural Monuments
 List of World Heritage Sites in Japan

References 

Further reading
Benesch, Oleg. "Castles and the Militarisation of Urban Society in Imperial Japan," Transactions of the Royal Historical Society, Vol. 28 (Dec. 2018), pp. 107-134.

External links 

 
 Japan's Samurai Castles
 Asian Historical Architecture – Himeji Castle
 Japanese Castle Explorer – Himeji Castle
 UNESCO World Heritage Centre – Himeji Castle
 Japan Atlas: Himeji Castle

Video
 The White Fortress: Himeji-jo (UNESCO video on YouTube)
 
 Discover the Himeji Castle in Japan
 Virtual tour of Himeji Castle examining its modern history on the Japan's Modern Castles YouTube channel

1581 establishments in Japan
Buildings and structures completed in 1346
Buildings and structures completed in 1581
Buildings and structures completed in 1609
Castles in Hyōgo Prefecture
Buildings and structures in Himeji
Tourist attractions in Himeji
Honda clan
Houses completed in 1618
Ikeda clan
Important Cultural Properties of Japan
Kuroda clan
Maebashi-Matsudaira clan
National Treasures of Japan
Okudaira-Matsudaira clan
Reportedly haunted locations in Japan
Sakai clan
Sakakibara clan
Special Historic Sites
Toyotomi clan
World Heritage Sites in Japan